Francis Hawkins (c.1643- 19 February 1699) was an  Anglican priest at the time of the Glorious Revolution.

Education
At 16 years old, Hawkins joined Peterhouse, Cambridge as a sizar for the period between  1659 and 1660. He studied at Fotheringhay Grammar School where he matriculated in 1661.  Then he continued his education at Peterhouse with a B.A. 1663-4; Scholar, 1664; M.A. 1667 and D.D.  in 1679.

Family
Hawkins had a wife and eight children, including Francis (1689), William (1686) and George (I704).

Appointments
Vicar : St Mary's  Willesden, Middlesex, (1670-99)
Chaplain : St Peter's Chapel, Tower of London (1673-1689} 
Rector : Gedney (sinecure rectory) (1678 - 1699 )
Preacher : Throughout the diocese of Lincoln (1678)
Preacher : Gedney (sinecure rectory) (1678 )
Dean : Chichester cathedral, Dean of Chichester (1688 -1699 )
Prebendary : St Paul's Cathedral, Wenlocksbarn Prebend (1699)
Perpetual Vicar : Willesden (1699 )

Legal proceedings and James II
In February 1681  a certain Edward Fitzharris, wrote a libelous letter against the king James II of England, for this he was sent to the Tower of London.  The Commons subsequently impeached
Fitzharris, with the intent of getting the matter presented in court. The chaplain of the Tower, Hawkins, operating in the interests of the court, offered Fitzharris a pardon if he would accuse a member of the House of Commons, Lord Howard of Escrick, of writing the libel against the king. However the Hawkins offer of a pardon was concocted and Fitzharris was executed 1 July 1681. The false confession was published the following day. For his involvement in this matter Hawkins was rewarded with the Deanery of Chichester.

In April 1688, the catholic James II of England re-issued his Declaration of Indulgence and ordered the Anglican clergy to read it in their churches. 
James appointed an Ecclesiastical Commission to find out the names of the clergy who had refused to read out the declaration. One who did not was Hawkins, who previously had been appointed by James  as chaplain to the Chapel of St. Peter within the Tower of London. A post he held for sixteen years. In 1689 James ejected Hawkins from his post for failure to read the declaration, though Hawkins refused to be turned out of his house.

Notes

References

Sources

 
 
 
 
 
 
 

1699 deaths
Deans of Chichester
1643 births
Alumni of Peterhouse, Cambridge